Zhou Qi (born 16 January 1996) is a Chinese professional basketball player who last played for the South East Melbourne Phoenix of the National Basketball League (NBL). He has been a regular member of the China men's national basketball team since 2014, winning a gold team medal in the 2015 FIBA Asia Championship and the 2018 Asian Games.

A center, Zhou started his professional career playing for the Xinjiang Flying Tigers of the Chinese Basketball Association (CBA). In 2016, he entered the NBA draft and was selected 43rd overall by the Houston Rockets of the National Basketball Association (NBA). He played a total of 19 games across two seasons with the Rockets before being waived in 2018. Zhou returned to the Flying Tigers of the CBA soon after. In 2021, he joined the Phoenix in the Australian NBL.

Early career
Zhou Qi attended Fuxin Basketball School from 2005 in Fuxin, Liaoning, China.

Zhou first began appearing on scouting reports when he guided China to an unlikely youth team title in Turkey at the TBF International Under-16 Tournament in 2011. At age fifteen, Zhou put up 41 points, 28 rebounds, and 15 blocks in China's semifinal win over Germany, and then went for 30 points, 17 rebounds, and 8 blocks in the final against the host nation. A year later at the 2012 Albert Schweitzer Tournament, a traditional testing ground for the best teenage players in international basketball, Zhou reinforced his reputation as one to watch by averaging 16.2 points, 7.8 rebounds, and 4.2 blocks in 28.2 minutes per game.

In January 2014, Zhou left his boyhood team, the Liaoning Jaguars, to join the Xinjiang Flying Tigers. However, he was unable to play for Xinjiang until the 2014–15 season due to being underaged.

Professional career

Xinjiang Flying Tigers (2014–2017)
Although there were rumors that several U.S. college teams were courting him, the teenager decided to stay in China, and his move to the cash-flush Xinjiang team caused a firestorm of speculation within the local media. Initially, it was claimed Zhou had accepted a three-year, $744,000 deal that would have made him better paid than most of the Tigers' roster at the time, and the club was forced to publicly deny those stories.

In 2015–16, Xinjiang lost in the semifinals of the CBA playoffs. Zhou led the CBA in blocked shots in each of his first two seasons at 3.3 and 3.2 per game, respectively, while shooting 65 percent from two-point range in 73 total games.

In June 2016, Zhou reached an agreement with Xinjiang that would allow him to buy out his contract and join the NBA in 2017. After much back and forth, Zhou's representation in China and the U.S. secured a buyout that would allow him out of his contract at the conclusion of the 2016–17 season for the maximum league mandated amount permitted, which is $675,000.

In 2016–17, Zhou averaged 16.0 points and 10.0 rebounds while shooting 58.6% from the floor. He also ranked second in the CBA in blocks (2.3 bpg) and was named Defensive Player of the Year.  Zhou hit 20 3-pointers in 2016–17 after having 10 his first two seasons combined. He also helped Xinjiang win its first championship in 2016–17.

Houston Rockets (2017–2018)
After his second season with Xinjiang, Zhou declared for the 2016 NBA draft. He had the longest wingspan during the 2016 NBA Draft Combine at 7'7¾" (2.33 m). On 23 June 2016, he was selected with the 43rd overall pick by the Houston Rockets.

On 6 July 2017, Zhou signed with the Houston Rockets. He made his NBA debut on 21 October 2017, playing eight minutes in the fourth quarter of the Rockets' 107–91 win over the Dallas Mavericks, posting three rebounds and one block. On 1 November 2017, Zhou scored his first NBA points, finishing with three points against the New York Knicks. During his rookie season, Zhou had multiple assignments to the Rio Grande Valley Vipers of the NBA G League.

On 17 December 2018, the Rockets waived Zhou.

Return to the Flying Tigers (2019–2021) 
In August 2019, Zhou returned to the Xinjiang Flying Tigers.

South East Melbourne Phoenix (2021–2022)
On 8 September 2021, Zhou signed a two-year deal with the South East Melbourne Phoenix of the Australian National Basketball League (NBL) as a Special Restricted Player, with the second year being a player option.

On 27 September 2022, Zhou recommitted to the Phoenix for the 2022–23 NBL season. On 19 December 2022, he left the team and returned to China for family reasons.

National team career
Zhou made his debut with the senior Chinese national team during the 2014 Asian Games in Incheon, South Korea. He returned for the 2015 FIBA Asia Championship in Changsha, China, where he helped China win the championship with a win over the Philippines in the final. Zhou had 16 points and 14 rebounds in the championship game. He was subsequently named to the 2015 FIBA Asia Championship All-Star Five. Zhou later competed in the 2016 Summer Olympics with the Chinese national team.

Career statistics

NBA

Regular season 

|-
| align="left" | 
| align="left" | Houston
| 18 || 0 || 6.9 || .188 || .105 || .667 || 1.2 || .1 || .1 || .8 || 1.2
|-
| align="left" | 
| align="left" | Houston
| 1 || 0 || 1.0 || 1.000 || — || — || .0 || .0 || .0 || .0 || 2.0
|- class="sortbottom"
| colspan=2 align="left" | Career
| 19 || 0 || 6.6 || 21.2 || 10.5 || 66.7 || 1.2 || .1 || .1 || .7 || 1.3

Playoffs 

|-
| style="text-align:left;"| 2018
| style="text-align:left;"| Houston
| 3 || 0 || 2.0 || 1.000 || — || — || .3 || .0 || .0 || .0 || .7
|-
| style="text-align:center;" colspan="2"| Career
| 3 || 0 || 2.0 || 1.000 || — || — || .3 || .0 || .0 || .0 || .7

CBA 

|-
| align="left" | 2014–15
| align="left" | Xinjiang
| 31 || 20 || 29.1 || .696 || .100 || .740 || 6.9 || .7 || .8 || 3.2 || 14.0
|-
| align="left" | 2015–16
| align="left" | Xinjiang
| 42 || 40 || 34.2 || .603 || .600 || .758 || 9.7 || 1.5 || 1.1 || 3.1 || 15.8
|-
| align="left" | 2016–17
| align="left" | Xinjiang
| 44 || 41 || 32.8 || .558 || .364 || .717 || 9.9 || 1.1 || 1.0 || 2.3 || 15.9
|-
| align="left" | 2019–20
| align="left" | Xinjiang
| 44 || 44 || 33.1 || .534 || .311 || .694 || 13.1 || 1.9 || 1.2 || 2.2 || 21.9
|-
| align="left" | 2020–21
| align="left" | Xinjiang
| 44 || 38 || 32.7 || .517 || .291 || .590 || 11.8 || 2.7 || 1.0 || 2.2 || 20.7
|- class="sortbottom"
| colspan=2 align="left" | Career
| 205 || 183 || 32.5 || .561 || .317 || .690 || 10.5 || 1.6 || 1.0 || 2.6 || 17.9

NBL 

|-
| align="left" | 2021–22
| align="left" | Phoenix
| 24 || 23 || 21.1 || .636 || .000 || .604 || 6.6 || 0.5 || 0.4 || 1.8 || 11.6
|-
| align="left" | 2022–23
| align="left" | Phoenix
| 9 || 0 || 13.5 || .656 || .000 || .538 || 4.4 || 0.2 || 0.2 || 0.2 || 6.2
|- class="sortbottom"
| style="text-align:center;" colspan="2"| Career
| 33 || 23 || 19.0 || .639 || .000 || .589 || 6.0 || 0.4 || 0.3 || 1.4 || 10.1

References

External links

 Zhou Qi at nbl.com.au
Zhou Qi at cbaleague.com
Zhou Qi at archive.fiba.com
NBA Draft profile
DraftExpress profile

1996 births
Living people
Basketball players at the 2014 Asian Games
Basketball players at the 2016 Summer Olympics
Basketball players at the 2018 Asian Games
Basketball players from Henan
Centers (basketball)
Chinese expatriate basketball people in the United States
Chinese expatriate sportspeople in Australia
Chinese men's basketball players
Houston Rockets draft picks
Houston Rockets players
National Basketball Association players from China
Olympic basketball players of China
People from Xinxiang
Rio Grande Valley Vipers players
South East Melbourne Phoenix players
Xinjiang Flying Tigers players
Asian Games gold medalists for China
Asian Games medalists in basketball
Medalists at the 2018 Asian Games
2019 FIBA Basketball World Cup players